William Geoffrey McGivern (27 December 1930 – 15 August 2015) was an Australian rules footballer who played in the Victorian Football League (VFL).

In 1950, McGivern began his seven-year career with Melbourne, originally as a half-forward. McGivern won the club's best and fairest award in 1952, and played as a defender when the Demons overcame Collingwood by 28 points in the close 1955 Grand Final. But McGivern missed the 1956 Grand Final after he was injured in the second semi final. He played a total of 105 VFL games and kicked 53 goals, retiring at the end of the 1956 season due to chronic knee injuries.

McGivern died on 15 August 2015 at the age of 84.

References

External links

 
 

Keith 'Bluey' Truscott Trophy winners
Melbourne Football Club players
1930 births
2015 deaths
Australian rules footballers from Geelong
Melbourne Football Club Premiership players
One-time VFL/AFL Premiership players